Alliance Party (in Swedish: Allianspartiet) is a political party in Sweden. The party was formed in the mid-1990s, as a splinter group of the right-wing populist New Democracy. Initially the party had branches in Skåne, Värmland and Östergötland, but its activities have been largely centered in Skåne.

In the 2002 elections the party won two seats in the municipal council of Burlöv.

In 2006 the party contested municipal elections in Skåne, as well as the parliamentary election though in the latter case they failed to win any seats.

References

Political parties with year of establishment missing
Defunct political parties in Sweden